Oleksandr Mykolayovych Bondarenko (born 29 June 1966 in Zaporizhia) is a retired Ukrainian football player.

His twin brother Roman Bondarenko is also retired Ukrainian football player.

Career
He played in Hungary for BVSC Budapest. He also played in FC Torpedo Zaporizhia along with his twin brother, Roman, who spent almost ten years as the forward there. When there started financial troubles for BVSC Budapest (bankrupt since 2001) he returned to Odessa together with Oleksandr Nikiforov, and later back to the central Ukraine.

References

External links
 Database of players participating in UPL 

1966 births
Living people
Footballers from Zaporizhzhia
Ukrainian twins
Twin sportspeople
Ukrainian footballers
Ukraine international footballers
Ukrainian expatriate footballers
Expatriate footballers in Hungary
Ukrainian expatriate sportspeople in Hungary
Soviet footballers
Association football defenders
Ukrainian Premier League players
FC Metalurh Zaporizhzhia players
SC Tavriya Simferopol players
FC Temp Shepetivka players
FC Torpedo Zaporizhzhia players
FC Chornomorets Odesa players
Budapesti VSC footballers
FC Zirka Kropyvnytskyi players
Ukrainian football managers
FC Real Pharma Odesa managers